This list of buildings and structures in the Australian Capital Territory includes historically and architecturally significant buildings and structures in the Australian Capital Territory (ACT).

The recognition and legal protection of significant buildings and structures in the ACT is performed by numerous bodies:
National Heritage List is a list of places with outstanding heritage value to Australia; 
Commonwealth Heritage List is specifically for buildings owned by the Australian Government which are significant at any threshold including local, state/territory and National levels.
Places on these lists are protected under the Environment Protection and Biodiversity Conservation Act 1999. Listed places are protected under the Act which means that no-one can take an action that has, will have or is likely to have, a significant impact on the environment of a listed place, including its heritage values, without the approval of the Minister. It is a criminal offence not to comply with this legislation.
Register of the National Estate, the register is a list of historically significant places, this is a non-statutory list.
The National Trust of Australia administers several properties in the ACT, listing on this register is non-statutory.
Australian Capital Territory Heritage Register, places on the register are of particular importance to the people of the ACT and are thought to enrich the understanding of history and identity. Places on the register are legally protected under the Heritage Act 2004, and changes or development of them requires advice by the ACT Heritage Council on development issues to improve conservation outcomes.

The Royal Australian Institute of Architects also maintains a register of significant 20th-century buildings, which although it has no legal capacity to protect buildings, it provides information on architecturally significant buildings within the territory.

19th century

20th century

Pre World War II

Post World War II

See also
Government housing in Canberra

References

National Trust of Australia - ACT
ACT Heritage Register
RAIA ACT Chapter - Register of Significant Twentieth Century Architecture 
Australian Heritage Database
Commonwealth heritage places in the Australian Capital Territory

 01
.
Bui
Landmarks in Canberra